Dalmataphaenops chiarae is a species of beetle in the family Carabidae, the only species in the genus Dalmataphaenops.

References

Trechinae